In 2020, a general election for Council of the District of Columbia was held on November 3, and a special election was held on June 27. Elections were held in four of the districts and one at-large. The Democratic Party retained its control of the city council and the council became majority female for the first time since the 1998 election.

Jack Evans resigned from the city council, causing a special election. Evans unsuccessfully ran for his seat which was won by Brooke Pinto. Incumbent councilors Robert White, Pinto, Vincent C. Gray, and Trayon White won reelection. Janeese Lewis George won election to the city council after defeating incumbent councilor Brandon Todd while David Grosso retired and was succeeded by Christina Henderson.

This was the first city council election to have public campaign financing with $3.4 million being given to candidates and George being given the most at $281,055 during the campaign.

Background

Mayor won reelection in the 2018 election becoming the first mayor to win reelection since 2002. The District of Columbia Home Rule Act states that "not more than two of the at-large members shall be nominated by the same political party" which results in the Democratic Party being unable to run in all at-large districts. David Catania, a member of the city council from 1997 to 2015, was the last member of the Republican Party elected to the council, but changed his political affiliation to independent in 2004.

Campaign

At-large district

David Grosso, an independent member of the city council, announced that he would not seek reelection in 2020. Robert White announced that he would seek reelection on October 29, 2019.

Vincent Orange, who had been defeated by White in 2016 and resigned from the city council after taking a job at the United States Chamber of Commerce, announced that he would run in the election. Ed Lazere, the head of a left-wing think tank who had unsuccessfully challenged Phil Mendelson in the 2018 election, announced on March 17, 2020, that he would run as an independent candidate. Christina Henderson, a former staffer for Grosso and a legislative assistant for Senator Chuck Schumer, announced that she would run as an independent candidate. Marcus Goodwin, the president of the Young Democrats of America in Washington, D.C., announced that he would run as an independent candidate in the election.

Alexander Padro, who had served as a neighborhood commissioner from Central Shaw for twenty years, announced that he would run as an independent candidate. Markus Batchelor, who served as vice-president of the District of Columbia State Board of Education, announced that he would run in the election as an independent candidate. Mónica Palacio, who served as director of the Office of Human Rights in Washington, D.C., ran as an independent candidate in the election.

White won renomination in the Democratic primary without opposition. White and Henderson won in the general election.

2nd district

Patrick Kennedy, who has served as the co-chair for Jack Evans' 2016 campaign, announced on April 8, 2019, that he would run in the Democratic primary against Evans with neighborhood commissioner David Bender as his campaign manager. Jordan Grossman, who had worked as a staffer during Barack Obama's presidency and worked for Senator Amy Klobuchar, filed to run in the Democratic primary on May 15. Kishan Putta, a neighborhood commissioner from Georgetown and who had unsuccessfully ran for city council in the at-large in 2014, filed to run in the Democratic primary on June 26. Brooke Pinto, who had worked for Attorney General Karl Racine in his policy office, announced her campaign for the Democratic nomination on February 12, 2020. John Fanning, a neighborhood commissioner from Logan Circle, announced that he would run for the Democratic nomination. Katherine Venice announced that she would run in election as a Republican.

A recall attempt had been made against Evans, but the District of Columbia Board of Elections ruled that the recall campaign couldn't collect signatures due to them not filing the proper campaign finance paperwork. Evans, the longest serving member of the city council who had served from the 2nd district since 1991, resigned on January 17, 2020, while under investigation for ethics violations and after all twelve other members voted unanimously to recommend his expulsion. His resignation caused a special election to be held. Evans announced that he would run in the special election on January 28, but later dropped out of the special election while remaining in the Democratic primary.

Pinto won in the special election and the Democratic nomination. She won in the general election against independent candidates Randy Downs and Martín Miguel Fernandez and Statehood Green nominee Peter Bolton.

4th district

Brandon Todd, who had served on the city council since 2015, was the first incumbent member of the council to file for reelection. Janeese Lewis George, the former assistant attorney general, announced that she would run for the Democratic nomination and focused her campaign on attacking Todd's connection with Mayor Browser. George defeated Todd in the Democratic primary and defeated Statehood Green nominee Perry Redd in the general election.

7th district

Anthony Lorenzo Green, a neighborhood commissioner, announced on July 12, 2019, that he would run for the Democratic nomination for city council. Vincent C. Gray, who had previously served as mayor and was later elected to the city council, announced during an interview on July 17, that he would seek reelection to the city council. Veda Rasheed, a neighborhood commissioner, announced on September 9, that she would run. Kelvin Brown, who had unsuccessfully ran a write-in campaign for neighborhood commissioner, ran in the election. Gray won in the Democratic primary and faced no opposition in the general election.

8th district

Trayon White, who had served on the city council since 2017, announced that he would seek reelection on January 20, 2020. Stuart Anderson, who had previously worked as White's campaign manager, and Mike Austin, a neighborhood commissioner, ran in the primary. White won in the Democratic primary and in the general election.

Campaign finance

This was the first city council election to have public campaign financing and during the campaign $3.4 million was given to candidates. Fifty-six candidates attempted to receive public campaign financing and thirty-six qualified for the financing. Seven candidates who received public campaign financing won their elections including George who received the most at $281,055 during the campaign.

Endorsements

At-large district

2nd district

4th district

7th district

8th district

Notes

References

Council of the District of Columbia
Washington, D.C. Council